Bob Bryan and Mike Bryan were the defending champions, but lost in the second round to Juan Sebastián Cabal and Robert Farah.
Raven Klaasen and Marcelo Melo won the title, defeating Simone Bolelli and Fabio Fognini in the final, 6–3, 6–3.

Seeds
All seeds received a bye into the second round.

Draw

Finals

Top half

Bottom half

References
 Main Draw

Doubles